Holtz Bay is an inlet on the northeast coast of the island of Attu in the Aleutian Islands in Alaska.

Holtz Bay was among the landing sites of United States Army troops in the Battle of Attu on 11 May 1943, which led to the recapture of the island from the Japanese during World War II.

Notes

References
Merriam-Webster's Geographical Dictionary, Third Edition. Springfield, Massachusetts: Merriam-Webster, Incorporated, 1997. .

Landforms of the Aleutian Islands
Bodies of water of Aleutians West Census Area, Alaska
Bays of Alaska
Attu Island